Demetrio Román Isidoro (born 21 June 1959) is a Mexican architect and politician affiliated with the National Action Party. He served as a Deputy of the LX Legislature of the Mexican Congress representing Morelos. He previously served in the Congress of Morelos from 2000 to 2003 and the municipal president of Jiutepec from 2003 to 2006.

References

1959 births
Living people
Politicians from Morelos
Mexican architects
National Action Party (Mexico) politicians
21st-century Mexican politicians
Universidad Autónoma del Estado de Morelos alumni
Members of the Congress of Morelos
Municipal presidents in Morelos
Deputies of the LX Legislature of Mexico
Members of the Chamber of Deputies (Mexico) for Morelos